Masi is a surname. Notable people with the surname include:

 Alberto Masi (born 1992), Italian footballer
 Alex Masi, Italian musician
 Andrea Masi, Italian rugby player
 Andy Masi, American entrepreneur, real estate developer, and business executive
 Angela Masi (born 1987), Italian politician
 Aristides Masi (born 1977), former Paraguayan footballer
 Binta Masi Garba (born 1967), Nigerian politician, businesswoman and administrator
 Denis Masi (born 1942), British artist
 Esala Masi (born 1974), retired Fijian footballer
 Fabio De Masi (born 1980), German politician
 Federico Masi (born 1990), Italian footballer
 Francesco De Masi, Italian musician
 Gianluca Masi, Italian astrophysicist
 Giuseppe Di Masi (born 1981), Italian footballer
 Jason Masi, American folk/rock singer-songwriter and musician
 Julie Masi, Canadian musician
 Kitso Masi (born 1984), Motswana actor
 Lance de Masi (born 1949), president of the American University in Dubai
 Manoa Masi (born 1974), former Fijian professional footballer
 Mattia Masi (born 1984), Sammarinese footballer
 Michael Masi (born 1978), former Formula One race director.
 Phil Masi, American baseball player
 Reni Masi (born 1933 or 1934), former Canadian politician
 Sébastien Masi, French Michelin-starred head chef in Ireland
 Seraphim Masi (1797–1884), American silversmith